I-34 was a Kaidai Junsen Type B1 submarine of the Imperial Japanese Navy. During World War II, while on a Yanagi mission between Japan and Germany carrying strategic raw materials and information, she was sunk by the British submarine  using Ultra intelligence.

Service history

Commissioning
Her keel was laid down at the Sasebo Dockyard on 1 January 1941; she was launched on 24 September. She was commissioned and assigned to the Kure Naval District on 31 August 1942. Commander Tatsushi Irie (入江達) took command in March 1943.

During early 1943, she took part in supply missions and the eventual evacuation of the garrison of Kiska in the Aleutian Islands.

On 15 September 1943, she was assigned to a Yanagi (exchange) mission to Lorient, France. She arrived in Singapore on 22 October 1943 to take on passengers and cargo for her mission.

I-34 loaded a cargo of raw rubber, tungsten, tin, quinine, medicinal opium and samples of Japanese weapons.  She departed for Penang to load passengers on 11 November 1943. Due to a delay in loading the cargo, her passengers opted to meet her at Penang, thus saving them from death.

Unknown to Commander Irie or the crew, her movements were being tracked by Ultra intelligence, and a British submarine was sent to sink her.

Sinking

Of her 94 crew, only 14 survived to be picked up by a local junk.

I-34 was removed from the Imperial Japanese Navy list in January 1944. Her wreck was salvaged in 1962.

Notes

Bibliography
 HIJMS I 34

Further reading
 Miller, Vernon J. Analysis of Japanese Submarine Losses to Allied Submarines in World War II, Merriam Press, 36pgs,  
 Gibson, Lt John F., RNVR. Dark Seas Above, Gloucester:Tempus Publishing, 2000,   (Author was the Navigation Officer of HMS Taurus)

1941 ships
Japanese submarines lost during World War II
Maritime incidents in November 1943
Ships built by Sasebo Naval Arsenal
Ships of the Aleutian Islands campaign
Ships sunk by British submarines
Type B1 submarines
World War II shipwrecks in the Strait of Malacca
World War II submarines of Japan
Submarines sunk by submarines